The Cathedral Basilica of St. James is the cathedral church of the Diocese of Brooklyn. It is located at the corner of Jay Street and Cathedral Place in Downtown Brooklyn, New York City. It was built in 1903 and designed by George H. Streeton in the Neo-Georgian style.

History

The first church was built in 1822-1823 and dedicated to the patronage of St. James by Bishop John Connolly on August 28, 1823. It became the cathedral of Brooklyn when the diocese was established in 1853.

Brooklyn's first bishop, John Loughlin planned a new cathedral dedicated to the patroness of the diocese,  the Immaculate Conception and its construction started in 1868 in Fort Greene, at Green Street and Clermont Avenue. The cornerstone for the new cathedral was laid, and the walls built to a height of 10 to 20 feet before construction was stopped due to inadequate funds; of the planned complex, only a chapel (no longer extant) and the Bishop's residence (now LaSalle Hall of Bishop Loughlin Memorial High School) were completed.  In 1896, Louglin's successor Bishop McDonnell designated a St. James Cathedral a pro-cathedral, anticipating the completion of Immaculate Conception. Although the current church on the original site was built in 1903, it did not become a cathedral again until 1972. The newly elected Pope John Paul II visited in 1979, and formally designated it as a basilica in 1982.

While officially the cathedral for the diocese, many major ceremonies are held at larger churches because of St. James' small size.  Accordingly, St. Joseph's Church in Prospect Heights was named co-cathedral for the diocese in 2013.

The Rector of St. James' Cathedral Basilica is Father Bryan Patterson.

See also
List of cathedrals in New York

References 
Notes

External links
 Official Cathedral Site
 Roman Catholic Diocese of Brooklyn Official Site

James (Brooklyn), Cathedral Basilica of St.
Downtown Brooklyn
James (Brooklyn), Cathedral Basilica of St.
James (Brooklyn), Cathedral Basilica of St.
Roman Catholic churches completed in 1903
Religious organizations established in 1822
1822 establishments in New York (state)
Neoclassical architecture in New York City
Cathedrals in New York City
20th-century Roman Catholic church buildings in the United States
Neoclassical church buildings in the United States